Alexandro-Nevsky District is an administrative and municipal district (raion), one of the 25 in Ryazan Oblast, Russia. It is located in the south of the oblast. Its administrative center is the urban locality (a work settlement) of Alexandro-Nevsky. Population: 11,818 (2010 Census);  The population of the administrative center accounts for 34.0% of the district's total population.

History
Until June 18, 2012, the district was called Novoderevensky.

Notable residents 

Sergey Bizyukin (born 1982), activist, journalist and historian
Fyodor Shebanov (1921–1951), Soviet flying ace during the Korean War, born in the village of Studenki

References

Notes

Sources

Districts of Ryazan Oblast